The 1935 municipal election was held November 13, 1935 to elect a mayor and five aldermen to sit on Edmonton City Council and four trustees to sit on the public school board, while four trustees were acclaimed to the separate school board.  Voters also approved a requirement that candidates for city council be required to own property.

There were ten aldermen on city council, but five of the positions were already filled: Hugh MacDonald, John Wesley Fry, Dick Foote, John McCreath, and James East were all elected to two-year terms in 1934 and were still in office.

This election saw emergence of two new civic political parties. Candidates for the first time ran in an Edmonton municipal election under the Social Credit label, excited after winning majority government in the 1935 provincial election. The Tax Reform League, an anti-Social Credit organization, also ran candidates. carrying on the anti-tax work that the Civic Government Association had conducted in previous elections. 

There were seven trustees on the public school board, but three of the positions were already filled: Samuel Barnes, Frederick Casselman, and Izena Ross had all been elected to two-year terms in 1934 and were still in office.  The same was true of the separate school board, where A J Crowe (SS), J O Pilon, and J O'Hara were continuing.

Electoral system
Election of mayor and other single members conducted using First past the post.

Election of aldermen and schoolboard trustees conducted using Plurality block voting.

Voter turnout

There were 19,984 voters voting out of 48,003 eligible voters, for a voter turnout of 41.6%.

Results

 bold or  indicates elected
 italics indicate incumbent
 "SS", where data is available, indicates representative for Edmonton's South Side, with a minimum South Side representation instituted after the city of Strathcona, south of the North Saskatchewan River, amalgamated into Edmonton on February 1, 1912.

Mayor

Aldermen

Public school trustees

{| class="wikitable"
! colspan="2"| Party
! Candidate
! Votes
!
! Elected

Separate (Catholic) school trustees

Charles Gariepy, Thomas Malone, R D Tighe, and William Wilde (SS) were acclaimed.

Property Qualification Plebiscite

Shall a candidate for Mayor or Alderman be required to have a property qualification?
Yes - 14,478
No - 4,202

References

Election History, City of Edmonton: Elections and Census Office

1935
1935 elections in Canada
1935 in Alberta